The Ipiranga River is a river of Paraná state in southern Brazil. Arising in Imbituva municipality, it flows northwards to join the Bitumirim River.

See also
List of rivers of Paraná

References

Rivers of Paraná (state)